Kirkwood Mountain Resort is a year-round resort in Kirkwood, California, south of Lake Tahoe. The resort focuses on skiing and snowboarding in the winter and hiking and mountain-biking in the summer.

Kirkwood is one of the more well known resorts for having one of the highest average snowfalls and a broad selection of advanced skiing terrain. The mountain is unique in that it has a  ridgeline at the top. This makes Kirkwood popular for cliff drops and cornices. Average seasonal snowfall is  behind Sugar Bowl Ski Resort in the Sierra Nevada. Most of the region's resorts are at the northern end of the lake, near Truckee, California. Kirkwood, Sierra-at-Tahoe and Heavenly are located on the southern side of the lake.

Skiing and snowboarding
Two new surface tows opened in the 2008-2009 season to provide access to formerly "hike-to" terrain along Vista Ridge and Fawn Ridge.

In 2009 and 2010, Kirkwood hosted a leg of the North American Freeskiing Championships.

Summer activities
In the summer months, Kirkwood is a destination for mountain biking and hiking. Other activities include rope courses and a disc golf course.

History
Kirkwood is one of the more recent ski resorts to open in the Lake Tahoe region primarily because of accessibility through mountain passes, distance from South Lake Tahoe which is over 30 miles, and an all-weather highway to the resort from the populated western regions of California. Highway 88 (CA 88) was opened with all year round Caltrans snow plowing service in 1971. Kirkwood opened for business 1972.

Ownership
Vail Resorts, Inc. acquired Kirkwood Mountain Resort in April 2012.   Vail Resorts acquired two other Tahoe region resorts in the prior decade, Heavenly Mountain Resort and Northstar California, both of which subsequently experienced significant facility upgrades.

References

External links
Kirkwood Mountain Resort

Mountain biking venues in the United States
Ski areas and resorts in California
Companies based in Alpine County, California
Tourist attractions in Alpine County, California
Buildings and structures in Alpine County, California
Companies that have filed for Chapter 11 bankruptcy
Vail Resorts